Isocoma rusbyi, the Rusby's goldenbush, is a North American species of plants in the family Asteraceae. It has been found in the States of Arizona, Utah, New Mexico, and Colorado in the southwestern United States. Some of the populations lie inside Grand Canyon and Petrified Forest National Parks, others in the Glen Canyon National Recreation Area.

Isocoma rusbyi is a shrub up to 90 cm (3 feet) tall. Each flower head contains about 19-25 disc flowers but no ray flowers.

References

rusbyi
Endemic flora of the United States
Flora of Arizona
Flora of Colorado
Flora of New Mexico
Flora of Utah
Flora of the Colorado Plateau and Canyonlands region
Plants described in 1906
Taxa named by Edward Lee Greene
Flora without expected TNC conservation status